The 6GH8 (More commonly labeled as the 6GH8A)is a nine pin miniature vacuum tube, produced as a combination of medium-mu Triode and sharp-cutoff Pentode. It follows that the tube is divided into two sections - anode and cathode. Each of the sections had separate cathode.

Commonly this type of tubes are used in radio and television receiver. The basic application of the tube is in multivibrator-type horizontal-deflection circuits, AGC-amplifier and sync-separator. They were most common and popular in RCA's CTC line of color television sets, as color demodulators. They were infamous for their failure, and therefore, often needed replacing. Other RETMA triode/pentode combinations with a 6-volts heater include: 6F7, 6P7, 6U8, 6X8, 6X9, 6AG9, 6AH9, 6AN8, 6AT8, 6AU8, 6AW8, 6AX8, 6AZ8, 6BE8, 6BH8, 6BL8, 6BR8, 6CG8, 6CH8, 6CM8, 6CS8, 6CU8, 6CX8, 6DZ8, 6EA8, 6EB8, 6EH8, 6EU8, 6FG7, 6FV8, 6GE8, 6GJ7, 6GJ8, 6GN8, 6GV7, 6GV8, 6GW8, 6GX7, 6HB7, 6HG8, 6HL8, 6HZ8, 6JA8, 6JC8, 6JN8, 6JV8, 6JW8, 6KA8, 6KD8, 6KE8, 6KR8, 6KT8, 6KV8, 6KY8, 6KZ8, 6LC8, 6LF8, 6LJ8, 6LM8, 6LN8, 6LR8, 6LX8, 6MG8, 6MQ8, 6MU8, 6MV8

References 

Telecommunications-related introductions in 1973
Audiovisual introductions in 1973
Vacuum tubes